Kit Jennings (born December 7, 1952) is a Republican member of the Wyoming Senate, representing the 28th district from 2005 to 2013.

References

1952 births
Living people
Republican Party Wyoming state senators
Republican Party members of the Wyoming House of Representatives
Politicians from Casper, Wyoming
People from Glasgow, Montana